Amin al-Din, also transcribed Amin ad-Din and Amin ud-Din, is an Arabic name meaning "Trustee of the Faith". It is the name of:

Amin al-Din Rashid al-Din Vatvat, 13th-century Persian physician
Amin ud-din Ahmad Khan (1911–1983), Nawab of the state of Loharu
Aminuddin Dagar (1923–2000), Indian dhrupad singer
Mian Aminuddin, Chief Commissioner of Balochistan between 1949 and 1952
Aminuddin Harun, Malaysian politician

See also
Institut Aminuddin Baki, Malaysian educational management institute
SMK Aminuddin Baki, Johor Bahru, Malaysian public national school
SMK Aminuddin Baki, Kuala Lumpur, Malaysian public school

Arabic masculine given names